Omar el Baad (born 1 February 1996) is a Dutch footballer who plays for Excelsior Maassluis. He also holds Moroccan citizenship.

Club career
He made his professional debut in the Eredivisie for SC Cambuur on 27 November 2015 in a game against De Graafschap.

References

External links
 
 

1996 births
Living people
Footballers from The Hague
Dutch sportspeople of Moroccan descent
Association football defenders
Dutch footballers
Dutch expatriate footballers
SC Cambuur players
Umeå FC players
Excelsior Maassluis players
Eredivisie players
Eerste Divisie players
Ettan Fotboll players
Tweede Divisie players
Dutch expatriate sportspeople in Sweden
Expatriate footballers in Sweden